K. Unjiyaviduthi (Kattathi Unjiyaviduthi) is a village in the Pattukkottai taluk of Thanjavur district, Tamil Nadu, India.

School: K. Unjiyaviduthi has a Middle school up to 10th standard.

References 

 

Villages in Thanjavur district